The African Youth Championship 2007 was held in the Republic of the Congo. It also served as qualification for the 2007 FIFA U-20 World Cup.

Qualification

Preliminary round
Cape Verde, Swaziland and Uganda withdrew. As a result, Senegal, Mozambique and Zimbabwe advanced to the next round.

|}

First round
Benin and DR Congo withdrew. As a result, Tunisia and Burkina Faso advanced to the next round.

|}

Second round

|}

Squads

Teams
The following teams qualified for the tournament:

 
 
  (host)

Group stage

Group A

January 20, 2007 

 

January 23, 2007 

 

January 26, 2007

Group B

January 21, 2007 

January 24, 2007 

 

January 27, 2007

Knockout stages

Semifinals
January 30, 2007

Third place play-off
February 2, 2007

Finals
February 3, 2007

Winner

Top scorers

Qualifiers for the 2007 FIFA U-20 World Cup

External links
Results by RSSSF

Africa U-20 Cup of Nations
Youth Championship
African Youth Championship
2007 in youth association football